Evgeni Vladimirovich Galkin (born 27 November 1975, in Chelyabinsk, Soviet Union) is a Russian professional ice hockey winger who currently plays for Traktor Chelyabinsk of the Kontinental Hockey League (KHL).

Career statistics

References

External links

 

1975 births
Living people
Russian ice hockey right wingers
Sportspeople from Chelyabinsk
Chelmet Chelyabinsk players
Metallurg Magnitogorsk players
Molot-Prikamye Perm players
Traktor Chelyabinsk players
Yuzhny Ural Orsk players